The Mle 1951 (Model 1951) or MI AP ID 51 is a small circular French brown plastic cased minimum metal mine anti-personnel blast mine. The mine uses a pressure fuze that works by driving a firing pin through a friction sensitive compound (a mixture of Red Phosphorus and glass). The mines safety is a small cap that sits over the pressure fuze and prevents it being pressed. The mine can be used with anti-handling devices.

The mines was in service with the French Army and was used in Algeria. It was superseded by the Mle 1955 mine (MI AP DV 59)

Specifications
 Height: 52 mm
 Diameter: 70 mm
 Weight: 85 g
 Explosive content: 45 g of Tolite and 15 g of Tetryl
 Operating pressure: 5 kg

References
 Brassey's Essential Guide To Anti-Personnel Landmines

Anti-personnel mines
Land mines of France